The Secret is a 2007 French thriller film directed by Vincent Perez and starring David Duchovny, Olivia Thirlby, and Lili Taylor. It is a remake of Yōjirō Takita's Himitsu, a 1999 Japanese film produced by Yasuhiro Mase, written by Hiroshi Saitô.

Plot
The beginning of the film reveals the strained relationship between Hannah (Lili Taylor) and her teenaged daughter Samantha (Olivia Thirlby). Hannah has been the primary disciplinarian as opposed to Samantha's permissive father Ben (David Duchovny). During a heated argument in the car with Samantha, Hannah's focus is momentarily diverted from the road, causing a head-on collision with an oncoming truck. Mother and daughter are taken to the hospital's ICU, both of them code, and Hannah dies. Unknown to Ben, Hannah's spirit migrates to Samantha's body, but he eventually believes it when 'Samantha' tells him things that only his wife would know. 

Both resolve that Hannah continue to live as Samantha, for if and when she returns. Living in Samantha's body, Hannah endeavors to maintain an emotional relationship with her husband while struggling with the often confusing impulses of a teenager. Ben and Hannah come perilously close to being intimate as man and wife. Hannah begins to learn a lot about the previously unknown (to her) life her daughter was living, which helps her understand how harrowing a teen's life can be. She faces demanding schoolwork that she finds largely unfamiliar; a couple of decades have passed since her own graduation. And she discovers that Samantha's life has been a challenge to meet her parents' expectations for academic excellence and behavior, all while being overwhelmed by adolescent hormones and a confused sense of self. This includes the discovery that Samantha was having sex with multiple partners. Hannah struggles to keep her grip; and Ben's possessiveness toward his wife's soul in his daughter's body threatens to completely overwhelm both of their lives, with nearly disastrous results. Hannah also starts to rediscover her own lost dreams when teachers praise her talent as a photographer.

Hannah's conflict with Ben comes to a head when she escapes through a bedroom window and goes to Samantha's friends, who persuade her to try Ketamine, causing Hannah to hallucinate and see herself dead, as Hannah. When Ben tracks her down and takes her home, Samantha briefly reappears then disappears again, over the traumatic realization that her mother is dead. Ben and Hannah both realize that Samantha is coming back. Hannah makes final preparations for Samantha's return, and makes a video explaining to Samantha what happened. After Samantha returns to her body, she belatedly sees how much she really did love her mother. The final scene shows a radically changed Samantha, who now has adopted her mother's handwriting.

Cast

References

External links
 
 
 

2007 direct-to-video films
2000s supernatural thriller films
Films based on works by Keigo Higashino
Films directed by Vincent Pérez
Remakes of Japanese films
2007 thriller drama films
2007 films
Body swapping in films
Films produced by Luc Besson
Films scored by Nathaniel Méchaly
English-language French films
2007 drama films
2000s English-language films